Leon Tim Draisaitl (born 27 October 1995) is a German professional ice hockey centre and alternate captain for the Edmonton Oilers of the National Hockey League (NHL). Draisaitl grew up playing hockey in Germany until he was selected second overall in the 2012 CHL Import Draft by the Prince Albert Raiders. After two seasons with the Raiders, he was drafted third overall by the Edmonton Oilers in the 2014 NHL Entry Draft. In 2020, Draisaitl became the first German player to win the Art Ross Trophy as the leading point scorer in the NHL, the Hart Memorial Trophy as regular season MVP, and the Ted Lindsay Award for most outstanding player.

Draisaitl is the son of former German national team player Peter Draisaitl, who represented West Germany and Germany in 146 games, including at World Championships, the World Cup and at the 1988, 1992 and 1998 Nagano Olympic Winter Games.<ref>Eishockey-Talent Draisaitl: Mit Wucht auf die große Bühne  Der Spiegel, published: 28 June 2014. Retrieved 4 July 2014</ref>

 Early life 
Draisaitl was born on 27 October 1995 in Cologne, Germany, to Peter and Sandra Draisaitl. When he was a child, Draisaitl's father played ice hockey for the Kölner Haie of the Deutsche Eishockey Liga and appeared in three Winter Olympics with the German national team. Draisaitl played a number of sports as a child, including soccer, but he was most interested in ice hockey. As an adolescent, Draisaitl played with the Kölner Haie under-16 team and the Adler Mannheim under-18 team while skating on the side with the Ravensburg Towerstars, a team his father coached. During the 2011–12 German Development League (Deutsche Nachwuchsliga) season, Draisaitl recorded 21 goals and 56 points in 35 games for Jungadler Mannheim and was named the league's Player of the Year.

 Playing career 
Major junior

Coming off of his Player of the Year season in the German Development League, Draisaitl was selected second overall in the 2012 CHL Import Draft by the Prince Albert Raiders of the Western Hockey League (WHL).

Draisaitl was traded to the Kelowna Rockets during the 2015 World Junior Championships, the trade made official on 5 January. Draisaitl helped the Rockets to the 2015 WHL Championship, where he was named playoff MVP after scoring 28 points in 19 games. Draisaitl won the Stafford Smythe Trophy as Memorial Cup MVP the same year, although the Rockets did not win the 2015 Memorial Cup, losing the championship final in overtime 2–1 to the Oshawa Generals.

Professional
2014–2017: NHL debut
Draisaitl was drafted third overall in the 2014 NHL Entry Draft by the Edmonton Oilers, making him the highest drafted German-trained player in NHL history (Dany Heatley, who was selected second overall in 2000, was born in Germany but raised in Canada).

On 12 August 2014, Draisaitl signed a three-year, entry-level contract with Edmonton. Making the Oilers' NHL opening night roster out of training camp, Draisaitl made his NHL debut on 9 October 2014 against the Calgary Flames. He scored his first NHL goal on 24 October 2014 against Carolina Hurricanes goaltender Anton Khudobin. Draisaitl appeared in 37 games for the Oilers during the 2014–15 season, recording two goals and four assists, before being returned to the Prince Albert Raiders. The move was made partly to prevent Draisaitl from moving one year closer to free agency which he would have done had he been on the Oilers' roster for more than 40 NHL games).

During the last Oilers game at Rexall Place on 6 April 2016, Draisaitl scored the last NHL goal to be scored there in a 6–2 win over the Vancouver Canucks.

The 2016–17 NHL season saw both Draisaitl and the Oilers reach new levels of success. On 23 March 2017, he became the first Oiler player since 1990 to have six-straight multi-point games. Draisaitl finished the regular season with 29 goals and 48 assists, while the Oilers, powered by new captain Connor McDavid and Draisaitl, ended a 10-year playoff drought and clinched a berth in the 2017 Stanley Cup playoffs by finishing second in the Pacific Division. Facing the San Jose Sharks in the first round, Draisaitl scored his first NHL playoff goal in the Oilers' series-clinching 3–1 Game 6 win. The Oilers advanced into the second round to meet the Anaheim Ducks. With the Oilers on the brink of elimination in Game 6 of the series on May 7, Draisaitl became the second youngest Oiler in franchise history to score a hat-trick in the Stanley Cup playoffs and the fifth player in Oilers history to score five or more points in a playoff game, helping the team force Game 7. The Oilers subsequently were eliminated in a 2–1 loss in Game 7, with Draisaitl's thwarted attempt at a tying goal midway through the third period was dubbed the "save of the game" by the NHL.

On 16 August 2017, Draisaitl signed an eight-year, $68 million contract extension with the Oilers worth an annual average cap hit of $8.5 million. The signing was controversial at the time in terms of the dollar figure, but it would rapidly in the following years come to be seen as one of the best-value contracts in the league as Draisaitl blossomed into a star forward.

2017–2020: Rise to stardom and MVP season
Following the playoff success in 2017, expectations were high for the Oilers entering the 2017–18, but it would prove to be a disappointing year both for the team and for Draisaitl. He dealt with injury that caused him to miss a few games, and correspondingly saw his scoring slightly regress, which caused the Toronto Star'' to dub him "maddeningly inconsistent." The team crashed down the standings and missed the playoffs, with the decision-making of general manager Peter Chiarelli increasingly being called into question. 

The 2018–19 season saw further disappointments for the team. A 9–10–1 start saw Chiarelli relieve coach Todd McLellan, but successor Ken Hitchcock fared no better with 14–14–2 record by mid-January. After blowout losses, Chiarelli was himself sacked. In the midst of this, however, Draisaitl had a new career-best season in point production. In the Oilers' final game of the year on 6 April 2019, Draisaitl became the sixth Oiler (and the first since Craig Simpson in 1987–88) to score at least 50 goals in a season and the ninth Oiler to score at least 100 points in an NHL season, and finished the season with 105 points. In the off-season, Ken Holland was hired as the team's new general manager.

Having already hit new milestones in scoring and increasingly recognized as one of the league's best players, the 2019–20 season would see further improvements for Draisaitl, as he for the first time eclipsed teammate McDavid in point production. By the time the onset of the COVID-19 pandemic prematurely halted the regular season in March, Draisaitl had notched 43 goals and a league-leading 67 assists in 71 games played. Prior to the pandemic, he had been on pace to challenge Tampa Bay Lightning player Nikita Kucherov's modern era record 128-point regular season from the previous year. Notwithstanding that disappointment, the 110 points he had managed were the best of any player that season, securing him the Art Ross Trophy as the leading scorer for the year. He was the third Oilers player (after Wayne Gretzky and McDavid) and first German player to achieve that distinction. He was subsequently also awarded the Hart Memorial Trophy, awarded by the Professional Hockey Writers' Association to the league's most valuable player, and Ted Lindsay Award, voted on by the NHL Players' Association for the league's most outstanding player. When the NHL returned to play that July for the 2020 Stanley Cup playoffs, to be held in a bubble in Toronto and Edmonton, Draisaitl was one of 31 skaters that the Oilers took into their quarantine bubble. As the fifth-ranked team in the Western Conference at the time of the halt to the regular season, the Oilers played in a qualifying round against the Chicago Blackhawks, a team they had been expected to beat. However, the team struggled, noticeably lacking in scoring from players other than Draisaitl, McDavid, and Ryan Nugent-Hopkins, and were eliminated 3–1 in the series by the Blackhawks. Draisaitl managed 3 goals and 3 assists in four postseason games.

2021–present: Western Conference Final run
In light of pandemic restrictions on cross-border travel, the NHL temporarily realigned its structure for the 2020–21 season, with all Canadian teams playing in the North Division and interdivisional play suspended. Draisaitl and the Oilers enjoyed a strong season in this new format, though following his dominant prior season Draisaitl was now considered by many to again be operating in McDavid's shadow. On 31 January 2021, Draisaitl recorded six assists in the 8–5 win against the Ottawa Senators, becoming the first Oilers' player since Paul Coffey on 14 March 1986 to record a six-assist game. With 31 goals and 53 assists in 56 games, Draisaitl finished second in league scoring, distantly behind McDavid, whose historic season saw him score 105 points in 56 games. The Oilers advanced into the 2021 Stanley Cup playoffs for a series against the Winnipeg Jets. They were unexpectedly swept by the Jets in the first round of the 2021 Stanley Cup playoffs, with Draisaitl recording two goals and three assists in the four-game series.

Draisaitl scored 20 goals in his first 19 games, and lead the league in goal-scoring for much of the year, though he was ultimately overtaken in the race for the Rocket Richard Trophy by the Toronto Maple Leafs' Auston Matthews. After an excellent start to the season, both the Oilers and Draisaitl began suffering a marked decline in results, culminating in a 2–11–2 stretch of games in December and January. By early February they had dropped out of a playoff spot. Amidst extensive media discussion of the Oilers' lack of depth scoring and questionable goaltending, general manager Holland fired coach Dave Tippett and replaced him with Jay Woodcroft, previously the coach of the Oilers AHL affiliate Bakersfield Condors. The Oilers recovered their form under Woodcroft, finishing the season in second place in the Pacific Division to qualify for the playoffs after posting the third-best points percentage in the league after the coaching change with a 26–9–3 record. Draisaitl, meanwhile, continued to set new milestones, hitting the 50-goal mark for the second time in his career in an April 3 game against the Anaheim Ducks. His 50th goal was also his 100th point, reaching that mark for the third time. He then notched a new team record for power play goals in an April 12 victory over the Minnesota Wild. Ultimately he finished the regular season with a new high in goals (55) and tied his career-best 110 points. 

The Oilers advanced in the 2022 Stanley Cup playoffs to meet the Los Angeles Kings, seen as favourites to advance beyond the first round for only the second time in Draisaitl's career. The series proved to be a tough contest, and the Oilers were down 3–2 going into Game 6 in Los Angeles. The team avoided elimination, but in the course of the game Draisaitl sustained a high ankle sprain in a scrum with Kings defenceman Mikey Anderson. Draisaitl dressed for Game 7 and played over 22 minutes despite what many remarked on as limited mobility, helping the Oilers win the series and recording one assist. Due to his injury and resultant mobility issues, Draisaitl was primarily employed as a winger in the following games. The Oilers drew the Calgary Flames in the second round, the first playoff "Battle of Alberta" in 31 years. In the series against the Flames, Draisaitl set a playoff record of five straight games with three points or more, and by the close of the series was tied with McDavid for the playoff points lead with 26. After recording 17 points in 5 games, Draisaitl broke the Battle of Alberta record for most points in a series. In addition, Draisaitl became the fourth fastest player in NHL history to record 50 playoff points. The Oilers advanced to the Western Conference Final for the first time since 2006. The Oilers were defeated by the Colorado Avalanche in four games, bringing their postseason to an end. Draisaitl was credited with a strong performance through the series, including recording four primary assists in Game 4 in a failed bid to avoid elimination when the Oilers lost 6–5 in overtime. He was visibly in pain from his leg injury for much of the series. After the conclusion of the playoffs, the Oilers confirmed that he had been playing through a high ankle sprain since Game 6 of the first round.

International play

Draisaitl represents Germany internationally. He played for the German junior team in the World Junior Championships in 2013 and 2014, serving as team captain in the latter tournament. In the 2014 tournament, he was ejected from a round-robin game against the United States after he committed a hit from behind and was later issued a one-game suspension.

Draisaitl was named to the German senior team roster for the 2014 IIHF World Championship. He also selected to play for Germany at the 2018 IIHF World Championship.

Personal life 
Draisaitl and his girlfriend Celeste Desjardins have a dog named Bowie, who is featured on the Instagram account bowiesworldd.

Career statistics

Regular season and playoffs
Bold indicates led league

International

Awards and honours

References

External links

 

1995 births
Living people
Bakersfield Condors players
Edmonton Oilers draft picks
Edmonton Oilers players
Art Ross Trophy winners
Hart Memorial Trophy winners
Expatriate ice hockey players in Canada
Expatriate ice hockey players in the United States
German expatriate sportspeople in Canada
German expatriate sportspeople in the United States
German ice hockey centres
German ice hockey right wingers
German people of Czech descent
Kelowna Rockets players
Lester B. Pearson Award winners
National Hockey League first-round draft picks
Prince Albert Raiders players
Sportspeople from Cologne